USAV General Brehon B. Somervell (LSV-3) is a . The ship was built by VT Halter Marine, (formerly Moss Point Marine) of Gulfport, Mississippi. It is named for General Brehon B. Somervell, the Commanding General of the United States Army Service Forces in World War II.

The vessel is currently home-ported in Joint Base Pearl Harbor Hickam (JBPHH), Hawai’i and is assigned to the 8th Special Troops Battalion, 8th Theater Sustainment Command

In 1994 the vessel transported Save the PT Boat, Inc.'s PT-658 up the Columbia River to Portland, Oregon.

References

General Frank S. Besson-class support vessels
Transport ships of the United States Army